Joseph Alexander Landolina (born January 27, 1993) is an American inventor and biomedical engineer, who is known for starting his company Cresilon, Inc. (formerly Suneris, Inc.) at a young age.

Career
While an  undergrad at NYU Poly,  Landolina invented Vetigel, a substance intended for the treatment of wounds to skin, internal organs, and arteries. The gel can be used as a replacement for traditional gauze bandages. Landolina created the substance using the extracellular matrix matter from skin as a blueprint using plant-derived versions of polymers. In 2010, Landolina founded Suneris, Inc. with business partner Isaac Miller. Landolina is also a 2014 TED Fellow and received the Barry M. Goldwater Scholarship in 2013 for his work in the field of biomaterials.

Personal life and education
Landolina is Italian-American, and was born in Pine Bush in Ulster County, New York. As a child, he learned about chemistry from his grandfather at the family winery, Baldwin Vineyards. He graduated from Pine Bush High School in 2010 before attending New York University Polytechnic School of Engineering. As of 2015, he has a  bachelor's degree in Chemical and Biomolecular Engineering and a master's degree in Biomedical Engineering from New York University.

References

External links
 
 
 Interviews
 Video of interview, Tyler Mathisen, CNBC Dec. 23, 2014
 Video of Interview, Melissa Francis, Fox Business Network Nov. 26, 2014

1993 births
Living people
American chief executives
American bioengineers
Chief executives in the pharmaceutical industry
Polytechnic Institute of New York University alumni
21st-century American engineers
American people of Italian descent
21st-century American inventors